Tribals in Kerala (known in Malayalam as the Adivasis) are the tribal population found in the Indian state of Kerala. Most of the tribals of Kerala live in the forests and mountains of Western Ghats, bordering Karnataka and Tamil Nadu. 

Tribals in Kerala are officially designated as "Scheduled Tribes" for affirmative action purposes. Kerala Public Service Commission, Government of Kerala, lists thirty-six of Scheduled Tribes in Kerala. Tribals in Kerala are classified by Scheduled Tribes Development Department, Government of  Kerala into three sub-sets (Particularly Vulnerable, Marginalised and Minorities).

According to the 2011 Census of India, the Scheduled Tribe population in Kerala is 4,84,839 (1.5 % of the total population). Wayanad district has the highest number of tribals (1,51,443) in Kerala, followed by Idukki (55,815), Palakkad (48,972) and Kasaragod (48,857) and Kannur districts (41,371). Paniyan, Irula, Kattunaikan, and Adiyan are some of the major "communities" among Kerala tribals. 

A. K. Balan, Member of the Legislative Assembly from Tarur, is the current Kerala Minister for Welfare of Scheduled Castes, Scheduled Tribes and Backward Classes.

Tribals in Kerala - main

Kerala tribals - distribution

List of Scheduled Tribes in Kerala 

 As amended by the Scheduled Castes and Scheduled Tribes Order (Amendment Act) 1976.
 As amended by the Indian Constitution (Scheduled Castes) Orders (Second Amendment) Act, 2002 (Act 61 of 2002) vide Part VIII - Kerala - Schedule I notified in the Gazette of India, dated 18 December, 2002.
 As amended by the Scheduled Castes and Scheduled Tribes Orders (Amendment) Act, 2002 (Act 10 of 2003) vide Part VII - Kerala - Schedule II notified in the Gazette of India, dated 08 January, 2003.

Scheduled Tribes list for educational concession 
Source: http://www.stdd.kerala.gov.in/scheduled-tribes-kerala

 Allar (Aalan) 
 Layan (Konga Malayan, Malayan, Panimalayan) 
 ...  (in the areas of Malabar only) 
 Malavettuvan 
 Malamuthuvan 
 Kunduvadiyan 
 Pathiyan 
 Thachanadan Mooppan 
 Wayanad Kadar 
 Lalanadi 
 Chingathan 
 Malayar 
 Malapanicker 
 Irivandavan

References

External links 
 Scheduled Tribe Development Department (Government of Kerala)

Social groups of India
Ethnic groups in India
Kerala society
Tribes of India
Scheduled Tribes of India